Pachanga is a genre of music which is described as a mixture of son montuno and merengue and has an accompanying signature style of dance.

Pachanga or La Pachanga may also refer to:

Films and television
La Pachanga, 1981 film directed by Mexican filmmaker José Estrada

Music
Pachanga (duo), a Puerto Rican / German reggaeton and Latin music duo 
Pachanga (album), album by Argentine pop singer King África 
"La Pachanga", a 1959 song by Cuban musician Eduardo Davidson.
!Arriba! La Pachanga, 1959 album by Mongo Santamaría
Pachanga Latino Music Festival, first Latin-themed music, cultural arts and food festival originated in Austin, Texas, USA

See also
Pachanga Diliman F.C., a Filipino association football club based in Diliman, Quezon City
Pachangara District, one of six districts of the province Oyón in Peru
Pechanga or Pechanga Band of Luiseño Indians, a federally recognized tribe of Luiseño Indians based in Riverside County, California, where their reservation is located
Pechenga (disambiguation)